Sethu may refer to:

People
 Sethu (actor), Indian film actor and producer
 Sethu (writer) (born 1942), Indian writer
 Sethu (singer), Italian singer and rapper
 Sethu Eyyal, Indian film director
 Sethu Lakshmi, Indian actress
 Sethu Lakshmi Bayi (r. 1924–1931), Indian queen, maharani of Travancore
 Sethu Parvathi Bayi, queen-mother of Travancore
 Sethu Sriram, Indian cinematographer
 Sethu Vijayakumar, British-Indian academic
 Sethu Vinayagam, Indian stage and film actor
 Varada Sethu, British-Indian actress
 V. Sethuraman or Sethu, Indian dermatologist and actor
 Sethu of Sachi-Sethu, Indian screenwriter duo in Malayalam cinema
 Yugi Sethu, Indian actor
 K. S. Sethumadhavan or K.S. Sethu Madhavan (1931–2021), Indian film director
 Setumadhavarao Pagadi or Sethu Madhav Rao Pagadi, Indian historian

Places and geography
 Sethu Express, Indian train route between Chennai and Rameswaram, to the Rama Sethu
 Sethu Institute of Technology, technical institute in Madurai, Tamil Nadu, India

Others 
 Sethu (film), 1999 Indian Tamil-language film
 Sethu Boomi, 2016 Indian film
 Setu coins or Sethu coins, ancient coinage from India and Sri Lanka
 Sethu FC, Indian women's football club based in Madurai, Tamil Nadu
 Sethupathi, Indian rulers, considered protectors of Rama Sethu/Adam's Bridge

See also 
 Sethubandhanam (disambiguation)
 Sethupathi (disambiguation)
 SETU (disambiguation)